is a Japanese footballer who plays as a midfielder for Seoul E-Land FC in K League 2.

Club career

MFK Zemplín Michalovce
Nishi made his Fortuna Liga debut for Zemplín Michalovce against Slovan Bratislava on 18 February 2018.

References

External links
 
 
 Futbalnet profile
 

1990 births
Living people
Japanese footballers
Japanese expatriate footballers
Association football midfielders
Gwardia Koszalin players
Lechia Gdańsk players
Widzew Łódź players
OKS Stomil Olsztyn players
Legia Warsaw II players
MFK Zemplín Michalovce players
Slovak Super Liga players
Daegu FC players
Seoul E-Land FC players
K League 1 players
K League 2 players
Expatriate footballers in Poland
Japanese expatriate sportspeople in Poland
Expatriate footballers in Slovakia
Japanese expatriate sportspeople in Slovakia
Expatriate footballers in South Korea
Japanese expatriate sportspeople in South Korea